Kumari is a 1952 Indian Tamil-language film directed by R. Padmanaban, starring M. G. Ramachandran, Madhuri Devi and Sri Ranjani (Junior).

Plot 

The princess Kumari, while travelling in a horse carriage, meets with an accident when the horses run wild, and is rescued by a man named Vijayan. The two fall in love and the princess gives him a signet and invites him to her palace. Problems arise when the king wishes to get the princess married and the queen Chandravali wishes to have her married to her useless brother Sahaaran. After many thrilling incidents, the lovers are united and live happily ever after.

Cast 

Male cast
 M. G. Ramachandran  Vijayan
 Serukalathur Sama  Mandhara
 Vijayakumar  Prathap
 Stunt Somu  Vallaban
 T. S. Durairaj  Saharan
 Pulimoottai Ramasami  Pulimoottai
 Sayeeram  Viharan
 Kottapuli Jayaram  Minister
 Rajamani  Minister
 Ramaraj  Minister
 K. K. Mani  Mani Singh

Female cast
 Madhuri Devi  Chandravali
 Sri Ranjani (Junior)  Kumari
 Kantha Sohanlal  Jeela
 K. S. Angamuthu  Mother
 C. T. Rajakantham  Chandrika
 Padmavathi Ammal  Mangala
Supported by
Hundreds of circus gypsy's playedmale and female actors.

Production 
The film was produced and directed by R. Padmanaban. Ku. Sa. Krishnamurthi and S. M. Santhanam wrote the story and dialogues.
Cinematography was done by D. Marconi while V. P. Nataraja Mudaliyar handled the editing. Choreography was done by Sohanlal and Still photography was done by R. N. Nagaraja Rao.

The film was also made in Telugu with the title Rajeshwari.

Soundtrack 
The music was composed by K. V. Mahadevan and lyrics were by M. P. Sivam, T. K. Sundara Vathiyar and Ku. Sa. Krishnamoorthi. There were also gypsy dances choreographed by Sohanlal. One song rendered by Jikki off-screen, ‘Laalalee laallee…..' picturised on Madhuri Devi, became popular.

Release 
Kumari was released on 11 April 1952, and did not do well commercially.

References 

1952 films
1950s Tamil-language films
Films scored by K. V. Mahadevan